Aumerval is a commune in the Pas-de-Calais department in northern France.

Geography
A village located 25 miles (40 km) northwest of Arras at the junction of the D90 and D91 roads.

Population

Sights
 The church of St. Maur, dating from the seventeenth century.
 An eighteenth-century chapel.

See also
Communes of the Pas-de-Calais department

References

Communes of Pas-de-Calais